Kent County may refer to:

 Australia
 the former name of Kent Land District, Tasmania, Australia 
 Kent County, Western Australia

 Canada
 Kent County, New Brunswick
 Kent County, Ontario

 United Kingdom
 The County of Kent 

 United States
 Kent County, Delaware 
 Kent County, Maryland 
 Kent County, Michigan
 Kent County, Rhode Island 
 Kent County, Texas 
 New Kent County, Virginia